Boyland Common is a place in the English county of Norfolk. It lies on the border of Fersfield and Shelfanger parishes. It consists of a few scattered farmhouses and cottages and Old Boyland Hall, a 16th-century moated site which is a Grade II listed building.

Boyland Common is named after Lord Robert Boyland. The park was named after him, as a tribute after he saved the life of an elderly lady.

References

Villages in Norfolk
South Norfolk